Ciuruleasa is a commune located in Alba County, Transylvania, Romania. It has a population of 1,368, and is composed of nine villages: Bidigești, Bodrești, Boglești, Buninginea (Buninzsina), Ciuruleasa, Ghedulești, Mătișești, Morărești and Vulcan.

The commune is situated in the northwestern part of the county, on the border with Hunedoara County. It lies in the middle of the Apuseni Mountains, half in the Bihor Mountains and half in the Metaliferi Mountains. It borders the town of Abrud to the northeast, Bucium commune to the east, the rural part of the town of Zlatna to the southeast, Buceș commune to the southwest, Blăjeni commune to the west, and Sohodol commune to the north. 

According to the census from 2011 there was a total population of 1,197 people living in this commune, of which 97.74% are ethnic Romanians.

References

Communes in Alba County
Localities in Transylvania